Alfredo Pagani (6 September 1887 – 1984) was an Italian versatile athlete who competed in five different events at the 1912 Summer Olympics.

National records
 Hihj jump: 1.75 m (Tivoli, Italy 9 July 1911) - record holder until 18 August 1919.

Achievements

National titles
Pagani won a national championship at individual senior level.

Italian Athletics Championships
110 m hs: 1912

See also
 Men's high jump Italian record progression

References

External links
 

1887 births
1984 deaths
Italian male hurdlers
Italian male high jumpers
Italian male long jumpers
Italian male pentathletes
Italian decathletes
Olympic athletes of Italy
Athletes (track and field) at the 1912 Summer Olympics
Athletes from Rome
Olympic decathletes